Faraz Ali (born 25 April 1993) is a Pakistani first-class cricketer who plays for Pakistan International Airlines.

References

External links
 

1993 births
Living people
Pakistani cricketers
Pakistan International Airlines cricketers
Port Qasim Authority cricketers
Cricketers from Karachi